Rothko was a small nightclub and live music venue in the Lower East Side of Manhattan, New York City. The club opened in a former textile factory in May 2004, and closed in 2006. It featured a number of acts who subsequently went on to major chart success, such as The Killers, LCD Soundsystem and Futureheads, as well as already successful groups such as Sum 41 and Jon Spencer Blues Explosion.

External links
New York Mag review

Nightclubs in Manhattan
Former music venues in New York City
2004 establishments in New York City
2006 disestablishments in New York (state)
Lower East Side